Shojaabad (also Romanized as Shojā‘ābād; also known as Shojā‘ābād-e Jonūbī) is a village in Takab Rural District, Shahdad District, Kerman County, Kerman Province, Iran. At the 2006 census, its population was 94, in 25 families.

References 

Populated places in Kerman County